The 1994 Washington State Cougars football team was an American football team that represented Washington State University in the Pacific-10 Conference (Pac-10) during the 1994 NCAA Division I-A football season. In their sixth season under head coach Mike Price, the Cougars compiled an 7–4 regular season record (5–3 in Pac-10, fourth), and outscored their opponents 192 to 136.  The preseason media poll had picked WSU to finish last in the conference.

The team's statistical leaders included Chad Davis with 2,299 passing yards, Frank Madu with 494 rushing yards, and Albert Kennedy with 551 receiving yards.

Home games were played on campus at Martin Stadium in Pullman. The Cougars hosted and won the Apple Cup, (their second straight victory over the Huskies on the Palouse), and went to the second Alamo Bowl; they defeated Baylor for their eighth win, and were 21st in the final AP poll.

Schedule

Roster

Game summaries

Oregon

Washington

Alamo Bowl

NFL Draft
Four Cougars were selected in the 1995 NFL Draft.

References

Washington State
Washington State Cougars football seasons
Alamo Bowl champion seasons
Washington State Cougars football